Kampong Serani is a residential neighbourhood within the city of George Town in Penang, Malaysia. It is bounded by College Avenue to the west and Leandro's Lane to the east.

The neighbourhood was formerly inhabited by ethnic Eurasians, who had moved into the area as early as the 19th century. However, most of the original Eurasian residents had since relocated to other areas in George Town, following the redevelopment of Kampong Serani into a modern neighbourhood in the late 1990s. Despite the urbanisation, the neighbourhood still retains some of its Eurasian characteristics and is home to the Penang Eurasian Association.

Etymology 
Kampong Serani in Malay is a direct translation of the settlement's English name, Eurasian Village.

History 
The second batch of Eurasian settlers, which came after the first batch that had arrived in 1786 with Captain Francis Light, were fleeing religious persecution in Siam, They arrived at Pulau Tikus in 1811 and chose to build their settlement, named Kampong Serani, within the area. As the Eurasians were predominantly Catholic, the settlement was centred around the Church of the Immaculate Conception. Adjacent to the church was College General, a Catholic seminary which had been relocated to the settlement in 1808.

Towards the end of the 20th century, Kampong Serani was earmarked for redevelopment, drawing objections and protests by the Eurasian community. Eventually the settlement was completely bulldozed by 1994; commercial complexes and condominiums now stand at the site of the former Eurasian settlement. However, the street names within the neighbourhood, such as Leandro's Lane and College Lane, still bear Eurasian and Catholic influences, while the Penang Eurasian Association remains based at the area.

Transportation 
Kampong Serani is served by Rapid Penang's bus routes 101, 102, 104 and 304, as well as the free-of-charge Pulau Tikus Loop (PTL) and the Congestion Alleviation Transport (CAT) Tanjung Tokong route. These routes link Kampong Serani with George Town proper, as well as other destinations on Penang Island, including the Penang International Airport, Queensbay Mall, Batu Ferringhi and Teluk Bahang.

Education 
Kampong Serani is home to Convent Pulau Tikus and its primary branch, SRK Convent Pulau Tikus. The all-girls' school was established in 1922, before being relocated to its present-day grounds in 1950.

See also 

Kampung Siam
Pulau Tikus
 Ayer Rajah

References 

Neighbourhoods in George Town, Penang
Ethnic enclaves in Malaysia
Thai diaspora in Malaysia